Seelyville is a town in Lost Creek Township, Vigo County, in the U.S. state of Indiana. The population was 1,029 at the 2010 census. It is part of the Terre Haute Metropolitan Statistical Area.

History
Seelyville was originally called the "Woodsmills." The town was laid out by Moddisett, the owner of the land north of the Jonas Seely property.  When the Terre Haute and Eastern Railroad was built along the south side of town, the small whistle stop station hired Jonas Seely as station master. The name was originally the Seely Station but was later changed to Seelyville Station. The town expanded with the opening of the McKeen coal shaft, one of the earliest operated in the county. After passing through several hands, the mine closed operations in 1879. Others operated into the early 1900s. A post office was established in Seelyville in 1878.

Geography
Seelyville is located at  (39.492188, -87.266466).  The town lies east of Terre Haute along U.S. Route 40.

Climate
The climate in this area is characterized by hot, humid summers and generally mild to cool winters.  According to the Köppen climate classification system, Seelyville has a humid subtropical climate, abbreviated "Cfa" on climate maps.

Demographics

2010 census
As of the census of 2010, there were 1,029 people, 424 households, and 263 families living in the town. The racial makeup of the town was 97.8% White, 0.4% African American, 0.2% Native American, 0.2% Asian, 0.2% from other races, and 1.3% from two or more races. Hispanic or Latino of any race were 0.9% of the population.

There were 424 households, of which 31.4% had children under the age of 18 living with them, 44.8% were married couples living together, 12.7% had a female householder with no husband present, 4.5% had a male householder with no wife present, and 38.0% were non-families. 29.2% of all households were made up of individuals, and 10.6% had someone living alone who was 65 years of age or older. The average household size was 2.40 and the average family size was 2.99.

The median age in the town was 36.2 years. 23.2% of residents were under the age of 18; 10.4% were between the ages of 18 and 24; 27.5% were from 25 to 44; 27.5% were from 45 to 64; and 11.4% were 65 years of age or older. The gender makeup of the town was 50.0% male and 50.0% female.

2000 census
As of the census of 2000, there were 1,182 people, 491 households, and 326 families living in the town. The racial makeup of the town was 98.39% White, 0.68% African American, 0.17% Asian, 0.42% from other races, and 0.34% from two or more races. Hispanic or Latino of any race were 0.85% of the population.

There were 491 households, out of which 32.2% had children under the age of 18 living with them, 53.0% were married couples living together, 9.2% had a female householder with no husband present, and 33.6% were non-families. 27.1% of all households were made up of individuals, and 10.6% had someone living alone who was 65 years of age or older. The average household size was 2.38 and the average family size was 2.90.

In the town, the age distribution of the population shows 24.1% under the age of 18, 8.3% from 18 to 24, 29.5% from 25 to 44, 24.5% from 45 to 64, and 13.6% who were 65 years of age or older. The median age was 37 years. For every 100 females, there were 96.0 males. For every 100 females age 18 and over, there were 95.9 males.

The median income for a household in the town was $35,114, and the median income for a family was $45,167. Males had a median income of $31,000 versus $21,326 for females. The per capita income for the town was $17,588. About 3.5% of families and 7.4% of the population were below the poverty line, including 5.3% of those under age 18 and 14.3% of those age 65 or over.

Notable natives
One of Seelyville's most famous residents was New York Giants outfielder Josh Devore, sometimes referred to as the "Seelyville Speed Demon."

References

Towns in Vigo County, Indiana
Towns in Indiana
Terre Haute metropolitan area